The Music of Nashville: Season 5, Volume 1 is the ninth original soundtrack from the American musical drama television series Nashville, created by Academy Award winner Callie Khouri and starring Connie Britton as country music superstar Rayna Jaymes and Hayden Panettiere as Juliette Barnes. The album was released digitally on March 10, 2017, and on compact disc exclusively through Target in North America. The album reached number 8 on the US soundtrack charts. This album also marks the first release with the show's association with CMT as the show was canceled after its fourth season by ABC.

Track listing

References

Television soundtracks
2017 soundtrack albums
Big Machine Records soundtracks
Country music soundtracks
Nashville (2012 TV series)
Country music compilation albums
Country albums by American artists
Big Machine Records compilation albums